Cambridge–Dorchester Regional Airport  is a county-owned, public-use airport located three nautical miles (6 km) southeast of the central business district of Cambridge, in Dorchester County, Maryland, United States. Amber L. Hulsey, A.B.D, ASC is the Airport Director.

Facilities and aircraft 
It has one runway designated 16/34 with a 4,477 x 75 ft (1,365 x 23 m) asphalt surface.

For the 12-month period ending June 1, 2007, the airport had 25,698 aircraft operations, an average of 70 per day: 99% general aviation and 1% military. At that time there were 49 aircraft based at this airport: 80% single-engine, 6% multi-engine, 2% jet, 2% helicopter and 10% ultralight.

References

External links 
 Cambridge–Dorchester Airport (CGE) at Maryland Aviation Administration
 Airport page at Dorchester County web site
 Airport page at Dorchester County Office of Tourism web site

Airports in Maryland
Transportation buildings and structures in Dorchester County, Maryland
Cambridge, Maryland